Ahmed Mussa (born 10 September 1961), an Egyptian journalist and TV presenter. He also works for Sada El-Balad channel and presents political programs.

Early life and career 
Mussa was born in September 1961, in Sohag, Egypt.
In 1979, Mussa enrolled at the Faculty of Mass Communication at Sohag University, and graduated from it and obtained his BA in 1983, where he began working in the Egyptian media and press since his graduation.

Personal life 
Mussa married Aya al-Jammal, and had two children with her.

References

Living people
1961 births
Egyptian television personalities
Egyptian television people